Samantha Schoeffel-Hechinger (born 24 January 1981) is a former professional tennis player from France.

Biography
Schoeffel, who is originally from Cape Town, South Africa began competing on the professional circuit in 1996.

As a doubles player, she broke into the world's top 200, with WTA Tour quarterfinal appearances at the 1999 Internationaux de Strasbourg and the 2000 Belgian Open. She featured in the women's doubles main draw at the 1999 French Open, as a wildcard pairing with Stéphanie Foretz.

In 2001, she left the tour to play collegiate tennis at Florida State University, later returning to the professional circuit in 2006 and going on to win five ITF Circuit singles titles. She reached her best singles ranking of 430 in the world in 2009.

She lives in Obernai, France.

ITF finals

Singles (5–3)

Doubles (10–5)

References

External links
 
 

1981 births
Living people
French female tennis players
Florida State Seminoles women's tennis players
South African emigrants to France